Acanthosaura phuketensis, the Phuket horned tree agamid, is a species of arboreal lizard native to Phuket Province, Thailand. It was discovered in 2015. It is now the 11th species in the genus Acanthosaura.

Description 
Acanthosaura phuketensis is a medium-sized lizard ranging from 7.5 to 15 inches in length. It has horns running down from its head but stops at the beginning of its tail.  It is a lowland forest-dwelling species.

References 

Acanthosaura
Lizards of Asia
Reptiles described in 2015
Taxa named by Olivier Sylvain Gérard Pauwels
Taxa named by Montri Sumontha
Taxa named by Kirati Kunya
Taxa named by Perry L. Wood
Taxa named by Larry Lee Grismer